Übereisenbach is a municipality in the district of Bitburg-Prüm, in Rhineland-Palatinate, western Germany.

Geographical location
Übereisenbach is above the Our, across from the Luxembourgish village Untereisenbach.

History 
The place has been mentioned around 450 as a Frankish settlement. Until the end of the 18th century, the community Eisenbach, consisting of the three districts Untereisenbach, Obereisenbach and Übereisenbach, belonged to Luxembourg. As a result of the Congress of Vienna, Übereisenbach became part of Prussia, where Untereisenbach and Obereisenbach at the opposite shore of the Our remained Luxembourgish.

Attractions 
Worth seeing is primarily the fountain on the village square.

References 

Germany–Luxembourg border crossings
Bitburg-Prüm